Nager may refer to:
 Edward Nager (born 1927), American lawyer and politician
 Jesse Nager (born 1981), American actor and singer
The Nagar Valley in northern Pakistan
Nagar, Pakistan, a town
 Nagar District, an administrative unit
Nagar (princely state), a former autonomous princely state

See also 
 Nagar (disambiguation)